Landsjö Church is a church building in Kaxholmen in Sweden. Belonging to the Skärstad-Ölmstad Parish of the Church of Sweden, it was inaugurated in 1984.

References

External links

Skärstad-Ölmstad Parish 

20th-century Church of Sweden church buildings
Churches in Jönköping Municipality
Churches completed in 1984
1984 establishments in Sweden
Churches in the Diocese of Växjö